Vicinelli is an Italian surname, a diminutive of the surname Voisin. Notable people with the surname include:

Odoardo Vicinelli (1684–1755), Italian painter
Patrizia Vicinelli (1943–1991), Italian poet, writer, artist and actress

References

Italian-language surnames